"Oh, Susanna" is a minstrel song by Stephen Foster (1826–1864), first published in 1848. It is among the most popular American songs ever written. Members of the Western Writers of America chose it as one of the Top 100 Western songs of all time.

Background
In 1846, Stephen Foster moved to Cincinnati, Ohio, and became a bookkeeper with his brother's steamship company. While in Cincinnati, Foster wrote "Oh! Susanna", possibly for his men's social club. The song was first performed by a local quintet at a concert in Andrews' Eagle Ice Cream Saloon in Pittsburgh, Pennsylvania, on September 11, 1847. It was first published by W. C. Peters & Co. in Cincinnati in 1848. Blackface minstrel troupes performed the work, and, as was common at the time, many registered the song for copyright under their own names. As a result, it was copyrighted and published at least twenty-one times from February 25, 1848, through February 14, 1851. Foster earned just $100 ($ in 2016 dollars) for the song, but its popularity led the publishing firm Firth, Pond & Company to offer him a royalty rate of two cents per copy of sheet music sold, convincing him to become the first fully professional songwriter in the United States.

The name Susanna may refer to Foster's deceased sister Charlotte, whose middle name was Susannah.

Song

The song blends together a variety of musical traditions. The opening line refers to "a banjo on my knee", but the song takes its beat from the polka, which had just reached the U.S. from Europe. Writer and musician Glenn Weiser suggests that the song incorporates elements of two previous compositions, both published in 1846: "Mary Blane", by Billy Whitlock, and "Rose of Alabama", by Silas S. Steele. He points out that the melody of the verse of "Oh! Susanna" resembles that of "Mary Blane", and the opening of the chorus of "Oh! Susanna" is almost identical to that of "Rose of Alabama". Moreover, the story lines of both "Oh! Susanna" and "The Rose of Alabama" involve a lover going from one Deep Southern state to another with his banjo in search of his sweetheart, which suggests that Foster got the inspiration for his lyrics from Steele's song.

The first two phrases of the melody are based on the major pentatonic scale. 

The song contains contradictory lines such as "It rain'd all night the day I left, The weather it was dry, The sun so hot I froze to death...", which have been described as "nonsense". It is one of the songs by Foster that use the word "nigger" (others are "Old Uncle Ned" and "Oh! Lemuel", both also among Foster's early works), which appears in the second verse ("De lectric fluid magnified, And killed five hundred nigger.").

Popularity and adaptations
The song is one of Stephen Foster's best-known songs, and it also is one of the best-known American songs. No American song had sold more than 5,000 copies before; "Oh! Susanna" sold over 100,000. After its publication, it quickly became known as an "unofficial theme of the Forty-Niners", with new lyrics about traveling to California with a "washpan on my knee". A traditional Pennsylvania Dutch version uses Foster's melody but replaces the lyrics entirely.

Notable recordings

 One of the earliest recordings, using the original "killed five hundred Nigger" lyrics, was released by Harry C. Browne in 1916 (Columbia COL A-2218). Browne also released other openly racist songs that same year, including Nigger Love a Watermelon, Ha! Ha! Ha!.
 The song is sung by a band in Wilson (1944) during the 1912 Democratic National Convention.
 A 1955 novelty recording of the song by The Singing Dogs reached No. 22 on the US Billboard Pop Singles chart, and No. 13 in the UK.
 Bing Crosby included the song in a medley on his album 101 Gang Songs (1961).
 In 1963, The Big 3 recorded Tim Rose's composition "The Banjo Song", which sets Foster's lyrics to a completely new melody. Rose's melody was then used for Shocking Blue's 1969 hit Venus (Shocking Blue song). Neil Young and Crazy Horse covered Rose's version on their 2012 album Americana.
 A humorous recording of "Oh! Susanna" was the last track on the second album by The Byrds, Turn! Turn! Turn!, in 1965.
 James Taylor also included a version of the song on his second album, Sweet Baby James, in 1970.

References

External links

 "Oh! Susanna" on Grey Gull record 4125 c.1923 sung by Arthur Fields - Original lyrics
 Artist Nikki Hornsby's grandfather "Cheerful" Dan Hornsby recorded this song for Columbia Records #1268-D 1929
 
 First edition (W.C. Peters, 1848) scanned by the Library of Congress

American folk songs
Blackface minstrel songs
Songs written by Stephen Foster
Songs about Alabama
Songs about Louisiana
Songs of the American Civil War
Polkas
1848 songs
American children's songs
Music of Cincinnati